The Valley Football Association (VFA) is a football-only athletic conference comprising fifteen high schools located within northeastern and central Wisconsin. The conference was formed in 2010, when the Wisconsin Interscholastic Athletic Association merged the Fox Valley Association (FVA) and Wisconsin Valley Conference (WVC). The merger was a result of the WVC having difficulty scheduling football games due to only having six active football participants at the time. The first season of play was 2011.

History 
In 2014, Hortonville High School replaced original member Menasha High School, who departed the VFA for the Bay Conference.

In 2017, Wausau East High School left the conference becoming an independent school for football.

From 2017 to 2020, the conference was split into three geographic divisions: North, South, and West. The North Division comprised Appleton East, Appleton North, Appleton West, Kaukauna, and Kimberly , the South Division comprised Fond du Lac, Hortonville, Neenah, Oshkosh North, and Oshkosh West, and the West Division comprised Marshfield, D.C. Everest, Stevens Point, Wausau West, and Wisconsin Rapids Lincoln.

Only five VFA members competed in the 2020 season due to the COVID-19 pandemic. Those teams, alongside returning member Wausau East, competed in a single division. The members that went on hiatus played in spring 2021 in a temporary conference with members of the original Fox River Classic Conference and the Wisconsin Valley Conference. Of those teams, only Appleton West and Stevens Point returned to the VFA, while the remaining teams returned to the Fox Valley Association for football.

Members

Current members

Former members

Division championships
North

South

West
Valley Football

2022– Marshfield, Wausau West & Wisconsin Rapids

Division titles by school

References

External links
Valley Football Association

High school sports conferences and leagues in the United States
Wisconsin high school sports conferences